Varunya "Yuyee" Wongteanchai (born 7 January 1993) is a Thai tennis player. She is the younger sister of Varatchaya Wongteanchai who also plays on the ITF Women's Circuit.

On 3 October 2016, Varunya reached her highest WTA singles ranking of 616. On 9 February 2015, she peaked at No. 216 in the WTA doubles rankings.

Career
Wongteanchai has had more success in doubles than singles, she has won 17 ITF doubles titles. At the 2012 PTT Pattaya Open, she partnered her sister Varatchaya and they defeated Dominika Cibulková and Janette Husárová in the first round, before losing to eventual champions Sania Mirza and Anastasia Rodionova.

At the 2013 PTT Pattaya Open, Wongteanchai again partnered with her sister after the pair gained entry by an alternate spot. They defeated third seeds Chan Hao-ching and Chan Yung-jan in the first round, then defeated Irina Buryachok and Valeria Solovyeva in the quarterfinals, before losing to Akgul Amanmuradova and Alexandra Panova in the semifinals.

ITF finals

Singles (0–2)

Doubles (17–11)

References

External links
 
 

1993 births
Living people
Varunya Wongteanchai
Varunya Wongteanchai
Universiade medalists in tennis
Universiade silver medalists for Thailand
Medalists at the 2017 Summer Universiade
Varunya Wongteanchai